This is a list of notable child abuse cases in which children were illegally imprisoned for multiple years.

Cases of children imprisoned by relatives
 Alba Nidia Alvarez, Mariquita, Colombia, 25 years, discovered in March 2009.
 "Anna", Perryopolis, Pennsylvania, United States, 6 years, discovered on 6 February 1938.
 Jeffrey Baldwin, Toronto, Canada, 4 years, discovered November 30, 2002.
 Jürgen Bartsch, Langenberg, Germany, 6 years.
 Elisabeth Fritzl and her children, Austria, 24 years, discovered in April 2008.
 "Genie", Arcadia, California, United States, 13 years, discovered on 4 November 1970.
 Lydia Gouardo, Val-de-Marne, France, 28 years.
 Viktoria, Katharina, and Elisabeth (Linz sisters), Linz, Austria, 7 years.
 Sheffield incest case, United Kingdom, 25 years, discovered in November 2008.
Schollenberger Case, Lebanon, Pennsylvania, 10 years, discovered in May 2020.
 "M" and her children, Moe, Victoria, Australia, 28 years, discovered in February 2007.
 "Laura" Mongelli, Turin, Italy, 25 years.
 Blanche Monnier, Poitiers, France, 25 years.
 Turpin case, Perris, California, USA, 29 years, discovered on 14 January 2018.
 Rader/Beighley case, Pennsylvania, USA, 1 year.
Lucero case, Argentina, 20 years, discovered in May 2009.
 Elizabeth Wesson, her sisters, her children, her nieces and her nephews, Fresno, California, USA, 26 years, climaxed 2004.
 2019 South Wales paternal sex abuse case, South Wales, United Kingdom, 20 years.
 Murder of Arthur Labinjo-Hughes, Solihull, West Midlands, England, 1 year, discovered in June 2020.

Cases of abduction 

 Junko Furuta
 Jayme Closs, kidnapped after her parents' murder and held for 88 days.
 Murder of Sylvia Likens, a teenager tortured and repeatedly held captive in the basement by her caretaker and her children and their friends for three months.
 Jaycee Dugard, kidnappers Phillip and  Nancy Garrido, Antioch, California, USA, 18 years, 2 months, 16 days.
John Jamelske, serial rapist-kidnapper who, from 1988 to his apprehension in 2003, kidnapped a series of girls and women and held them captive in a concrete bunker beneath the yard of his home in DeWitt, a suburb of Syracuse, New York, United States. All 5 of his victims were from different ethnic origins and most from different age groups.
 Shawn Hornbeck and Ben Ownby, kidnapper Michael J. Devlin, Kirkwood, Missouri, USA, 4 years.
 Tanya Nicole Kach, kidnapper Thomas Hose, McKeesport, Pennsylvania, USA, 10 years.
 Natascha Kampusch, kidnapper Wolfgang Přiklopil, Vienna, Austria, 8 years, 5 months.
 Amanda Berry, Michelle Knight, and Georgina "Gina" DeJesus, kidnapper Ariel Castro, Cleveland, Ohio, USA, 9 to 11 years.
 Katya Martynova and Lena Samokhina, kidnapper Viktor Mokhov, Skopin, Ryazan, Russia, 3 to 4 years.
 Anna Saito, kidnapper Kabu Terauchi, Higashi-Nakano, Tokyo, Japan, 2 years.
 Fusako Sano, kidnapper Nobuyuki Satō, Kashiwazaki, Niigata Prefecture, Japan, 9 years, 2 months.
 Santa Ana kidnapping accusation of 15-year-old girl, held by Isidro Garcia, Santa Ana, California, USA, 10 years.
 Elizabeth Smart, kidnappers Brian David Mitchell and Wanda Barzee, Salt Lake City, Utah, and San Diego County, California, USA, 9 months.
 Steven Stayner, kidnappers Kenneth Parnell and Ervin Murphy, Merced, California, USA, 7 years.
 Alicia Kozakiewicz, kidnapper Scott Tyree, Pittsburgh, Pennsylvania, 4 days.

Sexual slavery of minors
 Kidwelly sex cult
 Jeffrey Epstein
 Birmingham bathing cult
 Lambeth slavery case

Other
 Kaspar Hauser, Nuremberg, Germany, 16 years.
 Marvin L. Maple, arrested in 2009 for kidnapping his grandchildren, 20 years earlier.
 Colleen Stan, an American woman who was kidnapped and held captive between 1977 and 1984.
 Alexander Komin, Vyatskiye Polyany, Kirov Oblast, Russia.

References

Detention
Child abuse
Child abuse Detention
Child abuse resulting in death